Stuart Crow (born August 21, 1959) is an American former racing driver. Crow won the 1990 United States Formula Super Vee Championship and the 2000 United States Formula 3 Championship.

Career

1983-1986: Formula Ford, Formula 2000

Crow’s introduction to motorsports began with dirt bikes and, later, IKF and WKA Karting.  He subsequently graduated to racing cars, starting with Formula Ford and Formula 2000. He quickly showed his mettle, winning the Formula 2000 class at the SCCA National Run-offs at Road Atlanta in 1985. The following season Crow graduated to the Canadian Formula 2000 Championship and scored his first professional victory at Quebec’s Sanair Super Speedway en route to sixth place in the series. In October 1986, Crow finished third at the CASC F2000 Grand National Canadian Run-off.

1987-2000: Formula Super Vee, Formula Atlantic, Formula Three

In the late 1980's Crow took the next step on the professional racing ladder, by competing in the Bosch VW Formula Super Vee Series, a national championship that propelled Michael Andretti, Al Unser Jr. and Arie Luyendyk into North America's premiere racing series' (Cart, IndyCar and IMSA). After contesting several races with smaller teams, Crow joined Ralt America in mid-1988 with immediate results, reeling-off a string of top ten finishes including a fifth place in the season finale that helped him secure eighth place in the season standings. Crow became a regular contender in the 1989 Super Vee series with eight top five finishes in a season that culminated with a win at St. Petersburg, the final event of a season that saw him finish third in the overall standings.

Crow began the 1990 Formula Super Vee season with back-to-back victories at Phoenix International Raceway and the Milwaukee Mile before posting a string of podium finishes at Cleveland, Road Atlanta, Mid-Ohio and Road America. Crow scored a third win at Nazareth Speedway before the season final at St.Petersburg where he drove a measured race, finished fourth and clinched the 1990 Bosch VW Super Vee Championship.

In 1991 Crow drove for BDJS/Ralt America in the United States Formula Atlantic Championship. Crow earned podium finishes on the streets of Des Moines and Watkins Glen, as well as a fourth place in the series’ most iconic race on the streets of Trois Rivieres in Quebec.  The highlight of the season came in Canada where Crow scored his first Formula Atlantic win at the Grand Prix of Toronto, a result that helped him secure fourth place overall in his first season of Formula Atlantic.

The following 16 months were perhaps the most productive of Crow’s racing career, although he fell just short of two championships. He stayed with BDJS/Ralt America for the 1992 Formula Atlantic Championship. Crow scored a dominant win at Mid-Ohio to compliment runner-up finishes at Mosport and Vancouver, a third place at Miami and a fourth place at Long Beach en route to third place in the overall standings. BDJS/Ralt America spent the first half of the 1992 season developing the new Ralt RT-40, likely missing out on several potential wins because of inevitable new car “teething” problems. Crow won three pole positions in 1992. He converted pole into a win at Mid-Ohio but mechanical retirements while leading at Circuit Trois-Rivières (broken half shaft) and at Nazareth a (broken throttle linkage) cost him a chance at the top step two more times and ultimately the championship. 

At the end of the 1992 Formula Atlantic season Crow teamed up with Dave McMillan Racing and journeyed Down Under to contest the 1993 New Zealand Formula Pacific Series. Crow scored wins at Timaru and the historic Pukekohe circuit, along with four runner-up finishes at Timaru, Wigram and Manfeild. A misunderstanding about the starting procedure in the final race of the series cost him a realistic chance at the championship and he was forced to settle for second place, three points adrift of veteran Kiwi Craig Baird and twenty five points ahead of Jos Verstappen.  

Crow returned to the Northern Hemisphere that spring for another Formula Atlantic campaign with BDJS/Ralt America. Crow won the 1993 season opener at Phoenix but crashed heavily in round three at Road Atlanta and subsequently had to withdraw from the championship after five rounds.

Although 1993 would effectively prove to be Crow's final season of professional racing, on the three occasions when he returned to professional racing he continued to be competitive. In 1994 Crow drove for Florida Sports Cars in the American Continental Championship at the Dallas Grand Prix and won. In 1996 Crow drove for BDJS/Ralt America at the fourth round of the Players's Toyota Atlantic Championship at Nazareth. He won pole and finished second to the eventual championship winner Patrick Carpentier. Years later, in 2000, Crow contested the United States Formula Three Championship with Dave McMillan Racing  and won the championship scoring three wins and four additional podiums.

Racing record

Career summary

American and International Open Wheel racing results
(key)

SCCA National Championship Runoffs

CASC F2000 Grand National Canadian Run-off

Canadian F2000

Formula Super Vee

Formula Atlantic

Formula Pacific

American Continental Championship

US Formula 3

References

External links
 Driver Database Profile
 Champ Car Stats

1959 births
Living people
Racing drivers from Dallas
SCCA National Championship Runoffs participants
SCCA Formula Super Vee drivers
Formula Super Vee Champions
Atlantic Championship drivers
Toyota Racing Series drivers
United States Formula Three Championship drivers